Mountain View was a station on the Boonton Branch of the Delaware, Lackawanna and Western Railroad. Located in the Mountain View section of Wayne Township, New Jersey, the station was at the Parish Drive bridge over the tracks. The western terminus. Just west of the station was Mountain View junction, where a connection was made to the Erie Railroad's New York and Greenwood Lake Railway was made.

History 
Construction of the railroad through the Mountain View section of Wayne began in 1869 when the Morris and Essex Railroad began building a freight line. Mountain View station opened on May 12, 1877 after construction began in the summer of 1873 with the North Bergen Tunnel through Bergen Hill. The new tunnel would get service on the Lackawanna to Hoboken for its new terminal. The station was rebuilt in 1909 by the railroad. The Parish Drive overpass was built north of the station in 1939  as part of work for the Works Progress Administration.

The station closed in April 1963 after the right-of-way through Paterson was purchased for the construction of Route 20 and Interstate 80. Mountain View was one of three stops closed when the Erie-Lackawanna Railroad moved service to the Main Line of the former Erie north of Paterson. The others were Totowa–Little Falls and Paterson's Marshall Street station.

Mountain View station on both the Lackawanna and the Erie served as connector points with bus service to the nearby Packanack Lake. People could commute to the lake by taking the train to either station, meeting with the free bus.

Bibliography

References

External links  
The Delaware, Lackawanna and Western's Boonton Line

Former Delaware, Lackawanna and Western Railroad stations
Railway stations closed in 1963
Railway stations in Passaic County, New Jersey
Former railway stations in New Jersey
Railway stations in the United States opened in 1877
1877 establishments in New Jersey
1963 disestablishments in New Jersey